also Mount Iwo is a volcano in the Akan Volcanic Complex of Hokkaidō, Japan. It sits within the borders of the town of Teshikaga. 

The mountain was once mined for sulphur, hence its name. To the Ainu the mountain was known as Atosanupuri (naked mountain). The mountain is quite bare. Despite its bareness and being a rather low mountain at  it hosts alpine plant life. It hosts colonies of Siberian Dwarf Pine, Rhododendron diversipilosum, and other members of Ericaceae.

Gallery

See also
List of volcanoes in Japan
List of mountains in Japan

References 

Io
Io